The 2001 UCI Road World Cup was the thirteenth edition of the UCI Road World Cup.

Races

Final standings

Riders

Teams

References

 
UCI
UCI Road World Cup (men)